The Nacogdoches Cogs were a minor league baseball team that played in the East Texas League in 1916. The team was the first, and only, known professional baseball team to be based is Nacogdoches, Texas, United States. The team was managed by Tom Cherry.

References

Baseball teams established in 1916
1916 establishments in Texas
Defunct minor league baseball teams
Defunct baseball teams in Texas
Baseball teams disestablished in 1916
East Texas League teams